An intracolonic explosion or colonic gas explosion is an explosion inside the colon of a person due to ignition of explosive gases such as methane. This can happen during colonic exploration, as a result of the electrical nature of a colonoscope.

A colonic gas explosion is rare; however, the result can be acute colonic perforation, which can be fatal.

Cause 
An explosion is triggered by a combination of combustible gases such as hydrogen or methane, combustive gas such as oxygen, and heat.

Prevention 
Careful bowel preparation, such as cleansing the colon before a procedure, is key to preventing an intracolonic explosion.

See also
 Fart lighting, the intentional ignition of flatulence using an ignition source such as a lighter

References

Further reading
 
 

Gastrointestinal tract disorders
Medical emergencies
Explosions